Suzanna Hamilton (born 8 February 1960) is an English actress. She played the role of Julia in the 1984 film adaptation of George Orwell's classic novel, Nineteen Eighty-Four. Her other film roles include Tess (1979), Brimstone and Treacle (1982), Wetherby (1985), and Out of Africa (1985). On television, she starred in the ITV drama Wish Me Luck (1988), the BBC medical drama Casualty (1993–94), and the STV drama McCallum (1995–97).

Early career

Hamilton was born in London and was a protégée of filmmaker Claude Whatham, who discovered her in a children's experimental theatre in North London in the early 1970s. The first feature in which she appeared was Swallows and Amazons (1974), which was directed by Whatham and based on the popular children's book of the same name by Arthur Ransome. Swallows and Amazons was filmed in 1973 and released in 1974. Billed as Zanna Hamilton, she was cast as Susan Walker, one of four young siblings collectively known as "the Swallows", who go on a camping and sailing holiday in the Lake District during the summer of 1929. Whatham later directed Hamilton as Princess Alice in the BBC miniseries, Disraeli (1978), which was later broadcast to North American audiences as a featured programme on Masterpiece Theatre.

In the mid-1970s Hamilton received acting training at the Anna Scher Theatre School in Islington and at the Central School of Speech and Drama in Swiss Cottage, Camden. For her first appearance in a big-budget film, Hamilton played Izz Huett, the lovesick dairymaid, in the Roman Polanski film Tess (1979), based on Thomas Hardy's Tess of the d'Urbervilles, which starred Nastassja Kinski in the title role. She also appeared as one of the boarding school girls who organise a strike against the Ministry of Education in The Wildcats of St. Trinian's (1980).

Hamilton's next significant role was in the Richard Loncraine film Brimstone & Treacle (1982), based on Dennis Potter's play of the same name. Hamilton starred as Patricia Bates, the traumatised, catatonic daughter of a devoutly religious, middle aged Home Counties couple (Denholm Elliott and Joan Plowright) whose lives are changed by a demonic drifter and con man who calls himself Martin Taylor, played by Sting. The following year, Suzanna Hamilton was featured in BBC-TV's paranormal mystery, A Pattern of Roses, with Helena Bonham Carter.

Hamilton was a member of the BBC's Radio Drama Company.

Nineteen Eighty-Four

Hamilton was cast as Julia opposite John Hurt as Winston Smith in the Michael Radford film Nineteen Eighty-Four (1984), based on the eponymous George Orwell dystopian novel. She obtained the role through the casting agency of the Anna Scher Theatre School. She was one of the school's earliest alumni, and the theatre is acknowledged in the film's closing credits. This performance raised her profile as a film actress and attracted critical praise, particularly from Vincent Canby in The New York Times.  However, her work was largely overshadowed by the death of fellow cast member Richard Burton, who delivered his final screen performance in the role of O'Brien, as well as by post-release controversy over the film's musical score.

Later television and film appearances

In 1985, Hamilton starred in British playwright David Hare's film Wetherby, opposite Vanessa Redgrave. Her next role was as Felicity in Sydney Pollack's Academy Award-winning Out of Africa, based on the memoirs of the Danish writer Isak Dinesen, and starring Meryl Streep, Robert Redford and Klaus Maria Brandauer.

By the latter half of the decade, the majority of her screen roles were in obscure European films made in exotic locations as well as numerous British television dramas. In the 1986 German film, which was shot in Thailand and loosely based on Joseph Conrad's 1915 novel Victory, Hamilton was cast as a saxophonist in an all-woman band touring seedy hotels and nightclubs in Southeast Asia. Her character, Julie, escapes a life of sexual slavery by fleeing with an eccentric German adventurer, played by Jürgen Prochnow, and the two of them take refuge on an island near Indonesia, which is already populated by a savage native warrior tribe. Also in 1986, Hamilton starred in the well-received television drama Johnny Bull, a film developed at the National Playwrights' Conference of the Eugene O'Neill Theatre Center and filmed in Tennessee. In this film, a period piece set in the mid-1940s just after VE Day, she was cast as Iris Kovacs, a lighthearted Cockney bride who travels to rural Pennsylvania to live with her new American G.I. husband (Peter MacNicol) and his working class Hungarian-immigrant coal-mining family; Colleen Dewhurst and Kathy Bates starred in supporting roles. That same year, Hamilton appeared as Emily Barkstone in Hold the Dream, the second of the three BBC miniseries based on Barbara Taylor Bradford's popular "Emma Harte" novels about the fortunes of a retail empire and the machinations of the business élite across three generations.

In 1987, she played the spirited but careless Anglo-French SOE spy, Matty Firman, in Wish Me Luck — an LWT miniseries, this one set in occupied France during World War II. In 1988, she appeared opposite Jon Finch in another low-budget German film, a short called The Voice, about six people who are held captive overnight on a floating discothèque. In 1989, she starred as the inscrutable femme fatale Anna Raven in the BBC miniseries of Never Come Back, a noirish conspiracy thriller based on the celebrated 1941 novel by John Mair, which takes place on the eve of the London Blitz during the so-called "Phoney War" of 1939–40. Hamilton also acted in the 1990 British television film, Small Zones, as a strong-willed Russian poet whose subversive writings have led to her indefinite imprisonment in a Soviet holding cell. In 1991, she appeared as Amelia, one of the five daughters placed under house arrest by their domineering mother, in the BBC adaptation of Spanish poet Federico García Lorca's play The House of Bernarda Alba; Glenda Jackson starred in the title role. She also had a supporting role in a 1992 TV film of Barbara Cartland's Regency-period bodice-ripper, Duel of Hearts.

Her next commercial film role was in a low-budget Gothic horror romance, Tale of a Vampire (1992), written and directed by a 27-year-old Anglo-Japanese film student, Shimako Sato. Hamilton made a dual appearance: first as Anne, a librarian in present-day London grieving the untimely death of her boyfriend; then as Anne's 19th century doppelgänger, Virginia Clemm, the real-life wife of Edgar Allan Poe—who, in the film, also happens to be the long-lost mistress of a lonely, centuries-old vampire played by Julian Sands. In 1993, she had a recurring role as Dr. Karen Goodliffe on the British TV hospital drama series, Casualty. In 1995, she appeared as John Hannah's love interest, Joanna Sparks, on the ITV crime series, McCallum.

In 1997, she appeared in The Island on Bird Street, a Danish period drama made in the Dogme 95 style, about an 11-year-old Jewish boy who hides from the Nazis in occupied Poland during World War II before he is reunited with his father. In this film, Hamilton had a brief cameo as the mother of a girl whom the boy befriends.  Most recently, she appeared as Vivienne in the 2005 short film, Benjamin's Struggle, described as "a compelling story set in 1930s Nazi Germany, about a nine-year-old Jewish boy who attempts to steal the original manuscript of Adolf Hitler's Mein Kampf, believing that it will topple the Third Reich and end the suffering of his family". In 2006, she appeared as Helen Gillespie in the ITV series, Jane Hall. In 2007, she appeared as Dr. Hillary Slayton in the children's television series, Dinosapien, which is filmed on location in southern Alberta, Canada.

Theatre
Hamilton is an accomplished theatre and radio actress. She made her first West End appearance on the London stage in 1982 as part of the original cast production of Tom Stoppard's play, The Real Thing. In 1993, she played the lead as a Welsh maid in the Bush Theatre's production of Lucinda Coxon's Waiting at the Water's Edge; in 2002, she was cast as Creusa in a Gate Theatre production of Euripides' Ion; and in early 2005, she appeared as Dora, a woman incarcerated in a 1920s asylum in the Salisbury Playhouse's production of Charlotte Jones' chamber drama, Airswimming. She also appeared in a 1991 audiobook recording of Julian Barnes' novel about a love triangle called Talking It Over and has been in many radio dramas. She has been involved in many festivals of new writing at various London theatres. In May 2018 she played Shakespeare's Juliet (in old age) for The Theatre, Chipping Norton, in Ben Power A Tender Thing and in August 2019 she portrayed a Rhodesian estate owner in My One True Friend at the Tristan Bates Theatre, London.

Personal life
Hamilton spent a short time away from acting in major films to bring up her son but continued to feature in television roles and in theatre and voice work. In 2015 she played "Barbara" in the BBC drama Doctors. and in 2017 she played "Sarah" in the BBC series The Cuckoo's Calling

Filmography

Film

Television

References

External links

Radio appearances

1960 births
English film actresses
English radio actresses
English television actresses
English stage actresses
English voice actresses
Alumni of the Anna Scher Theatre School
Alumni of the Royal Central School of Speech and Drama
Actresses from London
Living people
People educated at Pimlico Academy